Softstar Entertainment Inc., abbreviated as Softstar, is a Taiwanese video game developer and publisher based in Zhonghe District, New Taipei, with Mainland subsidiary branches in Beijing, Shanghai and Xiamen.

Softstar is famous among the Greater China regions for designing and publishing Chinese language role-playing and puzzle/simulation games, mainly for the PC platform. Its most popular franchises include The Legend of Sword and Fairy series, Xuan-Yuan Sword series, Richman series and Star Dream series.

References

External links 

  

Video game companies of Taiwan
Taiwanese companies established in 1988
Video game companies established in 1988
Companies based in New Taipei